The Wichita Wranglers were a minor league baseball team based in Wichita, Kansas. The team, which played in the Texas League, was the Double-A affiliate of Major League Baseball's San Diego Padres from 1987 to 1994 and the Kansas City Royals from 1995 to 2007. The Wranglers played in Wichita's Lawrence–Dumont Stadium. Built in 1934 and renovated for the second time in 2001, the park held 6,400 people as of the Wranglers' last season.

Following the completion of the 2007 season, the team was relocated to Springdale, Arkansas, where it became the Northwest Arkansas Naturals, which continued to play in the Texas League.

The Wranglers won the Texas League Championship in 1987, 1992, and 1999. In 1995, Wichita's Johnny Damon won the Texas League Player of the Year Award. Alex Gordon won the award in 2006. Andy Benes was selected as the league's Pitcher of the Year in 1989.

References

External links
Wichita, Kansas Minor League History at Baseball-Reference.com

Baseball teams established in 1987
Baseball teams disestablished in 2007
Sports in Wichita, Kansas
Defunct Texas League teams
San Diego Padres minor league affiliates
Kansas City Royals minor league affiliates
1987 establishments in Kansas
2007 disestablishments in Kansas
Defunct baseball teams in Kansas